The year 1981 in television involved some significant events. Below is a list of television-related events during 1981.

Events

Programs 
20/20 (1978–present)
60 Minutes (1968–present)
Alice (1976–1985)
All My Children (1970–2011)
American Bandstand (1952–1989)
Another World (1964–1999)
Archie Bunker's Place (1979–1983)
As the World Turns (1956–2010)
Barney Miller (1975–1982)
Battle of the Planets (1978–1985)
Benson (1979–1986)
Candid Camera (1948–2014) 
Captain Kangaroo (1955–1984)
Charlie's Angels (1976–1981)
CHiPs (1977–1983)
Dallas (1978–1991)
Days of Our Lives (1965–present)
Diff'rent Strokes (1978–1986)
Disney's Wonderful World (1979–1981)
Face the Nation (1954–present)
Family Feud (1976–1985, 1988–1995, 1999–present)
Fantasy Island (1977–1984)
Fat Albert and the Cosby Kids (1972–1984)
General Hospital (1963–present)
Good Morning America (1975–present)
Guiding Light (1952–2009)
Hallmark Hall of Fame (1951–present)
Happy Days (1974–1984)
Hart to Hart (1979–1984)
Hee Haw (1969–1992)
In Search of... (1977–1982)
It's a Living (1980–1982, 1985–1989)
Knots Landing (1979–1993)
Laverne & Shirley (1976–1983)
Little House on the Prairie (1974–1983)
Lou Grant (1977–1982)
Magnum, P.I. (1980–1988)
M*A*S*H (1972–1983)
Masterpiece Theatre (1971–present)
Match Game (1962–1969, 1973–1984, 1990–1991, 1998–1999)
Meet the Press (1947–present)
Monday Night Football (1970–present)
Mork & Mindy (1978–1982)
Nightline (1979–present)
One Day at a Time (1975–1984)
One Life to Live (1968–2012)
Quincy, M.E. (1976–1983)
Real People (1979–1984)
Ryan's Hope (1975–1989)
Saturday Night Live (1975–present)
Schoolhouse Rock! (1973–1986)
Search for Tomorrow (1951–1986)
Sesame Street (1969–present)
Soap (1977–1981)
Solid Gold (1980–1988)
Soul Train (1971–2006) 
SportsCenter (1979–present)
Taxi (1978–1983)
Texas (1980–1982)
That's Incredible! (1980–1984)
The Dean Martin Celebrity Roast (1974–1984)
The Doctors (1963–1982)
The Dukes of Hazzard (1979–1985)
The Edge of Night (1956–1984)
The Facts of Life (1979–1988)
The Jeffersons (1975–1985)
The Lawrence Welk Show (1955–1982)
The Love Boat (1977–1986)
The Mike Douglas Show (1961–1981)
The Muppet Show (1976-1981)
The P.T.L. Club (1976–1987)
The Price Is Right (1972–present)
The Today Show (1952–present)
The Tomorrow Show (1973–1982)
The Tonight Show (1954–present; full title has generally included the host's name)
The Waltons (1972–1981)
The Young and the Restless (1973–present)
This Old House (1979–present)
This Week in Baseball (1977–1998, 2000–present)
Three's Company (1977–1984)
Too Close for Comfort (1980–1987)
Trapper John, M.D. (1979–1986)
Truth or Consequences (1950–1988)
Wheel of Fortune (1975–present)
WKRP in Cincinnati (1978–1982)

Debuting this year

Ending this year

Changing networks

Made-for-TV movies and miniseries

Television stations

Station launches

Network affiliation changes

Station closures

Births

Deaths

See also
 1981 in the United States
 List of American films of 1981

References

External links 
List of 1981 American television series at IMDb